Cissus antarctica (synonym Cissus oblongata), called "kangaroo vine", is one of the best known species of the genus Cissus in the family of Vitaceae. It is a climbing plant, a vine, and comes from Australia.

Cultivation
Cissus antarctica is often used as a vine in subtropical climates, such as California, as an ornamental plant in gardens.
  
Kangaroo vine also is a popular interior or houseplant, a well adapted plant, even in subdued light. It does not do well above 15 °C, especially when exposed to central heating, which can cause the leaves to drop.

References

Flora of Queensland
Bushfood
antarctica
Vines
Garden plants of Australia
Drought-tolerant plants
House plants